Europe is traditionally defined as one of seven continents. Physiographically, it is the northwestern peninsula of the larger landmass known as Eurasia (or the larger Afro-Eurasia); Asia occupies the centre and east of this continuous landmass. Europe's eastern frontier is usually delineated by the Ural Mountains in Russia, which is the largest country by land area in the continent. The southeast boundary with Asia is not universally defined, but the modern definition is generally the Ural River or, less commonly, the Emba River. The boundary continues to the Caspian Sea, the crest of the Caucasus Mountains (or, less commonly, the river Kura in the Caucasus), and on to the Black Sea. The Bosporus, the Sea of Marmara, and the Dardanelles conclude the Asian boundary. The Mediterranean Sea to the south separates Europe from Africa. The western boundary is the Atlantic Ocean. Iceland is usually included in Europe because it is over twice as close to mainland Europe as mainland North America. There is ongoing debate on where the geographical centre of Europe falls.

Overview

Some geographical texts refer to a Eurasian continent given that Europe is not surrounded by sea and its southeastern border has always been variously defined for centuries.

In terms of shape, Europe is a collection of connected peninsulas and nearby islands. The two largest peninsulas are mainland Europe and Scandinavia to the north, divided from each other by the Baltic Sea. Three smaller peninsulas—Iberia, Italy, and the Balkans—emerge from the southern margin of the mainland. The Balkan peninsula is separated from Asia by the Black and Aegean Seas. Italy is separated from the Balkans by the Adriatic Sea, and from Iberia by the Mediterranean Sea, which also separates Europe from Africa. Eastward, mainland Europe widens much like the mouth of a funnel, until the boundary with Asia is reached at the Ural Mountains and Ural River, the Caspian Sea, and the Caucasus Mountains.

Land relief in Europe shows great variation within relatively small areas. The southern regions are mountainous while moving north the terrain descends from the high Alps, Pyrenees, and Carpathians, through hilly uplands, into broad, low northern plains, which are vast in the east. An arc of uplands also exists along the northwestern seaboard, beginning in southwestern Ireland, continuing across through western and northern Great Britain, and up along the mountainous, fjord-cut spine of Norway.

This description is simplified. Sub-regions such as Iberia and Italy contain their own complex features, as does mainland Europe itself, where the relief contains many plateaus, river valleys, and basins that complicate the general trend. Iceland and the British Isles are special cases. The former is of North Atlantic volcanic formation, while the latter consist of upland areas once joined to the mainland until cut off by rising sea levels.

Peninsula of peninsulas
Europe is sometimes called a "peninsula of peninsulas", to draw attention to the fact that Europe is a relatively small, elongated appendage to Asia, and that a large part of Europe is made up of peninsulas. A prehistoric perspective would include Britain and Ireland as the core of a further very significant European peninsula prior to the post-glacial rise in sea-levels.

Partial list of European peninsulas
 Absheron peninsula
 Balkan peninsula
 Peloponnese
 Chalkidiki
 Istria
 Gallipoli
 Brittany
 Cotentin Peninsula
 Crimea
 Fennoscandian Peninsula
 Kola Peninsula
 Scandinavian Peninsula
 Iberian Peninsula
 Italian Peninsula
 Jutland
 Kanin Peninsula

Geology 

Europe's most significant geological feature is the dichotomy between the highlands and mountains of Southern Europe and a vast, partially underwater, northern plain ranging from Great Britain in the west to the Ural Mountains in the east. These two halves are separated by the mountain chains of the Pyrenees and the Alps/Carpathians. The northern plains are delimited in the west by the Scandinavian mountains and the mountainous parts of the British Isles. The major shallow water bodies submerging parts of the northern plains are the Celtic Sea, the North Sea, the Baltic Sea complex, and the Barents Sea.

The northern plain contains the old geological continent of Baltica, and so may be regarded as the "main continent", while peripheral highlands and mountainous regions in south and west constitute fragments from various other geological continents.

The geology of Europe is hugely varied and complex, and gives rise to the wide variety of landscapes found across the continent, from the Scottish Highlands to the rolling plains of Hungary.

Population 
Figures for the population of Europe vary according to which definition of European boundaries is used. The population within the standard physical geographical boundaries was 701 million in 2005 according to the United Nations. In 2000 the population was 857 million, using a definition which includes the whole of the transcontinental countries of Russia and Turkey. Population growth is comparatively slow, and median age comparatively high in relation to the world's other continents.

Rivers 

The most important rivers in Europe are Danube, Volga, Rhine, Elbe, Oder and Dnieper, among others.

European rivers by length 

The longest rivers in Europe, directly flowing into the World Ocean or Endorheic basins, with their approximate lengths:

 Volga -   
 Danube - 
 Ural   -    
 Dnieper - 
 Don   -     
 Pechora - 
 Dniester - 
 Rhine   -   
 Elbe   -   
 Vistula - 
 Tagus   - 
 Daugava - 
 Loire - 
 Ebro - 
 Prut - 
 Neman - 
 Meuse - 
 Douro - 
 Kuban River - 
 Mezen - 
 Oder - 
 Guadiana - 
 Rhône - 
  Southern Bug - 
 Kuma - 
 Seine  - 
 Mureș - 
 Northern Dvina - 
 Po - 
 Guadalquivir - 
 Bolshoy Uzen - 
 Siret - 
 Terek - 
 Glomma -  (Norway's longest and most voluminous river)
 Garonne - 
 Kemijoki - 
 Main  (longest (right) tributary of Rhine)
 Torne - 
 Dalälven - 
 Maritsa - 
 Marne -  (major tributary of the Seine)
 Neris - 
 Júcar - 
 Dordogne - 
 Ume - 
 Ångerman -  (Sweden's longest rivers)
 Lule - 
 Gauja - 
 Weser - 
 Kalix -

European rivers by discharge 
The 15 rivers of Europe by average discharge, including only rivers directly flowing into the World Ocean or Endorheic basins:
 Volga - 8,087 m³/s (largest river in Eastern Europe)
 Danube - 6,450 m³/s (largest river in Central Europe)
 Pechora - 4,380m³/s
 Northern Dvina - 3,330m³/s
 Neva - 2,490 m³/s
 Rhine - 2,315 m³/s) (largest river in Western Europe)
 Rhône - 1,900 m³/s (largest river in France)
 Dnieper - 1,700 m³/s
 Po - 1,460 m³/s (largest river in Italy)
 Vistula - 1,080 m³/s (largest river in Poland)
 Don - 890 m³/s
 Mezen - 890 m³/s
 Loire - 889 m³/s (longest river in France)
 Elbe - 860 m³/s
 Glomma - 709 m³/s (Norway's longest and most voluminous river)

Lakes and inland seas

Major islands

Aegean Islands, Åland, Balearic Islands, Corsica, Crete, Cyprus (Adjacent to Asia), Fyn, Faroe Islands, Gotland, Great Britain, Hinnøya, Iceland, Ionian Islands, Ireland, Malta, North Jutlandic Island, Saaremaa, Sardinia, Senja, Sicily, Svalbard and Zealand.

Plains and lowlands

 Great European Plain, the largest landscape feature of Europe
 East European Plain
 Lower Danubian Plain, between Balkan Mountains and Southern Carpathians
 Danubian Plain (Bulgaria)
 Wallachian Plain
 North European Plain
 North German Plain (German section)
 Beauce, France
 Baetic Depression (Andalusian Plain), between Sierra Morena and Baetic System
 British Lowlands
 Central Swedish lowland
 Ebro Basin (Ebro Depression), between Pyrenees and Sistema Ibérico
 Meseta Central is a high plain plateau in central Spain (occupies roughly 40% of the country), between Cantabrian Mountains and Sistema Central
 Pannonian Plain, between Alps, Dinaric Mountains and Carpathian Mountains
 Po Valley, also known as Padan Plain, between Alps and Apennines
 Swiss Central Plateau, between the Jura Mountains and Swiss Alps
 Upper Rhine Plain, between Vosges Mountains and Black Forest Mountains
 Upper Thracian Plain, between Balkan Mountains (Sredna Gora) and Rila-Rhodope massif
 Other European coastal plains

Mountain ranges

Some of Europe's major mountain ranges are:
 Alps, in Central Western Europe
 Western Alps
 Eastern Alps
 Southern Alps
 Northern Alps
 Apennines, which run through Italy
 Baetic System, Spain, Iberian Peninsula

 Balkan Mountains, mainly Bulgaria, central Balkan Peninsula
 Sredna Gora Mountain range in central Bulgaria, situated south of and parallel to the Balkan Mountains
 Bohemian and other Variscan massifs (pre-Alpine mountain ranges) - Jura Mountains, Vosges, Palatinate Forest, Black Forest, Ore Mountains, Sudetes
 Cantabrian Mountains, which run across northern Spain
 Carpathian Mountains, a major mountain range in Central and Southern Europe
 Southern Carpathians, Romania
 Tatra Mountains, Slovakia and Poland
 Caucasus Mountains, which also separate Europe and Asia
 Crimean Mountains

 Dinaric Alps, a mountain range in the Balkans
 Pindus Mountains, Albania and Greece
 Pyrenees, the natural border between France and Spain
 Rila-Rhodope mountain system composed by massifs, including Pirin Mountain and Osogovo-Belasitsa mountain chain, mainly Bulgaria
 Šar-Korab-Jakupica-Baba-Kajmakčalan-Olympus, Albania, North Macedonia and Greece
 Scandinavian Mountains, a mountain range which runs through the Scandinavian Peninsula, includes the Kjølen mountains
 Scottish Highlands (including the Cairngorms) in the United Kingdom.
 Sierra Morena, Spain
 Sistema Ibérico, Spain
 Sistema Central, Spain
 Ural Mountains, which form the boundary between Europe and Asia

Land area in different classes of European mountainous terrain (classification from UNEP-WCMC):

Temperature and precipitation

The high mountainous areas of Europe are colder and have higher precipitation than lower areas, as is true of mountainous areas in general. Europe has less precipitation in the east than in central and western Europe. The temperature difference between summer and winter gradually increases from coastal northwest Europe to southeast inland Europe, ranging from Ireland, with a temperature difference of only 10 °C from the warmest to the coldest month, to the area north of the Caspian Sea, with a temperature difference of 40 °C. January average range from 13 °C in southern Spain and southern Greek islands to -20 °C in the northeastern part of European Russia. Desert climates are found in the European portion of Kazakhstan and South Eastern Spain.

Western Europe and parts of Central Europe generally fall into the temperate maritime climate (Cfb), the southern part is mostly a Mediterranean climate (mostly Csa, smaller area with Csb), the north-central part and east into central Russia is mostly a humid continental climate (Dfb) and the northern part of the continent is a subarctic climate (Dfc). In the extreme northern part (northernmost Russia; Svalbard), bordering the Arctic Ocean, is tundra climate (Et). Mountain ranges, such as the Alps and the Carpathian mountains, have a highland climate with large variations according to altitude and latitude.

Climate

Landlocked countries

The landlocked countries in Europe are: Andorra, Armenia, Austria, Belarus, Czech Republic, Hungary, Kosovo, Liechtenstein (which is doubly landlocked), Luxembourg, North Macedonia, Moldova, San Marino, Serbia, Slovakia, Switzerland, Vatican City

Switzerland, Liechtenstein, Austria, Czech Republic, Slovakia, Hungary, Serbia, and North Macedonia constitute a contiguous landlocked agglomeration of eight countries in Central Europe and the Balkans, stretching from Geneva all the way to Skopje. The other landlocked countries are "standalone" landlocked, not bordering any other such European one (the emphasis is necessary, since Kazakhstan borders Turkmenistan, Uzbekistan, and Kyrgyzstan, thus forming a vast landlocked expanse in Central Asia).

Countries consisting solely of islands or parts of islands
 Cyprus
 Iceland
 Ireland
 Malta
 United Kingdom

Countries bordering or spanning another continent

Countries whose capital is not the most populous

Note: Italy's capital, Rome, is the country's largest city if only the municipality (comune) is considered. Greater Milan is the largest Metropolitan Area in Italy.

Brussels is considered to be the largest city of Belgium, according to the population of the Brussels-Capital Region. The population of the City of Brussels is ~175,000. Antwerp is the biggest city of the country.

List of countries by the number of other countries they border

See also
 Regions of Europe
 European grid
 European Union
 Western Europe
 Central Europe
 Eastern Europe
 Northern Europe
 Southern Europe
 Southeast Europe
 Extreme points of Europe
 Intermediate Region
 Extreme points of the European Union
 List of European ultra-prominent peaks
 List of the highest European ultra-prominent peaks
 List of mountain ranges
 Southernmost glacial mass in Europe
 Countries bordering the European Union
 Extreme points of Eurasia
 Extreme points of Afro-Eurasia
 Geography of the European Union
 Special member state territories and the European Union
 Age of Discovery
 Explorers of Russia

References

External links 
 

Articles containing video clips
Geography